Kamloops station is a railway station in Kamloops, British Columbia, Canada. It serves as the overnight stopover point for the Rocky Mountaineer train service to Jasper, Banff and Calgary from Vancouver.

The station was originally built for Canadian National Railway  The station was declared a Heritage Railway Station in 1992. Via Rail trains call at the Kamloops North station, not this station. The station building was restored and was previously home to a location of The Keg. As of 2021, it is being remodelled as a local distillery and restaurant.

The Kamloops Heritage Railway, offers special excursion steam trains at various times through the year, trains depart from the station with tickets sold from their ticket office at 5-510 Lorne St near the station.

See also
 List of designated heritage railway stations of Canada

References

Designated Heritage Railway Stations in British Columbia
Buildings and structures in Kamloops
Railway stations in Canada opened in 1927
Rocky Mountaineer stations in British Columbia
Canadian National Railway stations in British Columbia
1927 establishments in British Columbia